Caledonia is a 1978 album by Alan Roberts and Dougie MacLean that contains the title song "Caledonia". It was recorded at Fairview Recording Studio and printed by Garrod & Lofthouse.

Track listing
All tracks are Traditional; except where noted.
Side A
"Plooboy Laddies" (4:00)
"Johnny Teasie Weasle" (3:00)
"Over My Mountain" (Dougie MacLean) (3:20)
"The Rowan Tree" (3:20)
"Mistress MacKinley's Breakfast Surreals" (3:25)

Side B
"Caledonia" (Dougie MacLean) (3:50)
"Mormond Braes" (2:30)
"Til Tomorrow" (Dougie MacLean) (4:36)
"Jennifer's Tunes" (3:10)
"Sleepy Toon" (4:06)

Personnel
Alan Roberts – guitar
Dougie McLean – guitar, vocals
Nigel Pegrum – percussion
Jon Gillaspie – synthesizer
Technical
Keith Herd, Roy Neve - engineer
George Peckham - mastering

1978 albums